1017 vs. the World is a collaborative EP by American rappers Lil Uzi Vert and Gucci Mane. It was released on November 23, 2016, by Generation Now and GUWOP. The EP features production by Honorable C.N.O.T.E., D. Rich, Mannie Fresh, Zaytoven, DP Beats and GLOhan Beats.

Track listing

Notes
 "In 04'" is stylised as "IN O4'".
 "Secure the Bag" contains a sample of the "Clock Tower" level theme by Hidenori Shoji and Haruyoshi Tomita, from the video game Super Monkey Ball 2.

References

Gucci Mane albums
Collaborative albums
Atlantic Records albums
Albums produced by Honorable C.N.O.T.E.
Albums produced by Zaytoven
Lil Uzi Vert albums
2016 EPs
Hip hop EPs